Cupp is a surname. Notable people with the name include:

 Bob Cupp (1939–2016); American golf course designer
 James N. Cupp (1921–2004), United States Marine Corps aviator
 Pat Cupp (born 1938), American rockabilly guitarist
 Robert R. Cupp (born 1950), American politician; Speaker of the Ohio House of Representatives
 Ruth Williams Cupp (1928–2016); American lawyer, legislator, judge, and author
 S. E. Cupp (born 1979), American television host, political commentator, and writer

See also
Kupp, surname